Toffanin is a surname. Notable people with the surname include:

Mario Toffanin (1912–1999), Italian Communist partisan
Martina Toffanin (born 2000), Italian racing cyclist
Silvia Toffanin (born 1979), Italian television host, model, and journalist

Italian-language surnames